José Pérez (born 21 February 1958) is a Spanish fencer. He competed in the individual épée event at the 1980 Summer Olympics.

References

External links
 

1958 births
Living people
Spanish male épée fencers
Olympic fencers of Spain
Fencers at the 1980 Summer Olympics